Larry Bakman, is an American attorney and television personality, who was a judge on Judge Judith Sheindlin's TV series Hot Bench from 2014 to 2016

Education

Bakman graduated cum laude from The University of California Los Angeles with a B.A. degree, and he received his Juris Doctor from the Southwestern University School of Law.

Career

Bakman is a former Los Angeles City Attorney. He then began a practice in the area of criminal defense. He defended several cases brought by the United States Government under the RICO act. One example is a federal death penalty case in which his client was charged with a triple homicide in furtherance of Mexican Mafia activities. After an eleven-month trial, Bakman obtained an acquittal on all charges.

Bakman has served as a Judge Pro Tem for the Van Nuys Municipal Court and the West Los Angeles Municipal Court.  Currently, he is admitted to practice in California, New York, and various federal courts.

Bakman was one of the original three judges on the courtroom reality TV series Hot Bench.  After appearing on Hot Bench for its first two seasons, Bakman announced in October 2016 that he was leaving the show to devote more time to his law practice.  His replacement was Michael Corriero, a former New York State Court judge.

References 

Year of birth missing (living people)
Living people
American judges
American television personalities